Halidon Hill is a summit, about  west of the centre of Berwick-upon-Tweed, on the border of England and Scotland. It reaches 600 feet (180 m) high. The name of the hill indicates that it once had a fortification on its top. At the Battle of Halidon Hill in 1333, Edward III of England used longbowmen on the heights of the hill to defeat the Scottish army led by Archibald the "Tyneman" Douglas, Regent of Scotland.

An English army camped at Halidon Hill on 27 March 1560. The soldiers were sent into Scotland to help at the siege of Leith during the Scottish Reformation. Mary, Queen of Scots came to Halidon Hill to view Berwick on 15 November 1566 and met John Foster, Marshal of Berwick.

When James VI visited Halidon Hill near on 27 April 1588 there was a cannon salute and he spoke with members of the garrison. He gave the English commanding officers a gift of 100 gold crowns and to the porters (officers of lesser rank) 40 crowns described as "drinksilver". In April 1595 James VI and Anne of Denmark planned to come on a progress towards Berwick, including a visit to Halidon Hill which overlooked the town and its fortifications. The governor of Berwick, Henry Carey, 1st Baron Hunsdon wondered if the town should give them a cannon salute.

See also
List of places in the Scottish Borders
List of places in Scotland
List of battles (alphabetical)
Anglo-Scottish Wars

References

External links
English Heritage: Battle of Halidon Hill
GOOGLE book: "Halidon hill: a dramatic sketch from Scottish history" by Sir Walter Scott

Hills of Northumberland
Mountains and hills of the Scottish Borders